Youba Sambou (born 1944) is a Senegalese politician from Casamance who served in the government of Senegal as Minister of the Armed Forces from 2000 to 2002. He also served as Mayor of Bignona and was elected as a member of the National Assembly in 2007.

Biography 
Youba Sambou is of Jola descent and was born in Mlomp in Bignona Department in 1944. During the 1960s and 70s, he taught mathematics and physics at several lycées, before being appointed as a headmaster, initially in Diourbel and eventually (after a short administrative interlude in Paris) in Bignona in the 1990s.

Alongside his teaching duties, he took an active role in the Senegalese Democratic Party (PDS).

When PDS came to power in 2000, Sambou was named Minister of the Armed Forces in the cabinet of Moustapha Niasse, replacing Cheikh Hamidou Kane Mathiara of the Socialist Party. He was confirmed in his role on 12 May 2001. He was succeeded by Bécaye Diop.

Youba Sambou was elected as a member of the National Assembly in the 2007 parliamentary election. He was also Mayor of Bignona until 2009.  succeeded him in this position.

See also

Armed Forces of Senegal
Politics of Senegal

References

Bibliography 
Babacar Ndiaye & Waly Ndiaye, Présidents et ministres de la République du Sénégal, Dakar, 2006 (2nd edition), p. 355

1944 births
People from Casamance
Senegalese Democratic Party politicians
Defense ministers of Senegal
Military of Senegal
Mayors of places in Senegal
Members of the National Assembly (Senegal)
Living people